Books4cars is a web-based company in Seattle, Washington, that carries used and rare books related to cars, trucks and motorcycles, such as service manuals, owners manuals and historical books. The business was started in 1997 in Detroit, Michigan, from a home collection of books by automotive engineer and mechanic Alex Voss.  Books4cars relocated to Seattle's Columbia City neighborhood in 2000.

See also
 Book collecting

References
 
 
 

American book websites
Companies based in Seattle
Internet properties established in 1997